Les Misérables is a British television series based on the 1862 French historical novel of the same name by Victor Hugo. Adapted by Andrew Davies and directed by Tom Shankland, it stars Dominic West, David Oyelowo, and Lily Collins.

The series was produced by the BBC with support from PBS member station WGBH Boston's Masterpiece series. BBC Studios handles the distribution for the series. It was broadcast in the United Kingdom between 30 December 2018 and 3 February 2019.  In Canada, the series started broadcasting on 10 January 2021 on CBC and CBC Gem.

Cast

 Dominic West as Jean Valjean
 David Oyelowo as Javert
 Lily Collins as Fantine Thibault
 Adeel Akhtar as Monsieur Thénardier
 Johnny Flynn as Felix Tholomyès
 Henry Lloyd-Hughes as Col. Pontmercy
 David Bradley as Monsieur Gillenormand
 Derek Jacobi as Bishop Myriel

 Ron Cook as Hair and Teeth Dealer
 Alan David as the Scribe
 Kathryn Hunter as Madame Victurnien
 Olivia Colman as Madame Rosalie Thénardier

 Enzo Cilenti as Rivette

 Josh O'Connor as Marius Pontmercy
 Raphael Bishop and Woody Norman as young Marius
 Ellie Bamber as Cosette
 Mailow Defoy and Lia Giovanelli as young Cosette
 Erin Kellyman as Éponine Thénardier
 Sienna Barnes and Tiarna Williams as young Eponine
 Joseph Quinn as Enjolras
 Donald Sumpter as Monsieur Mabeuf

 Turlough Convery as Grantaire
 Archie Madekwe as Courfeyrac
 Alex Jarrett as Azelma Thénardier
 Amani Johnson and Isabelle Lewis as young Azelma
 Reece Yates as Gavroche
 Emmanuel Goffin as young Gavroche
 Emma Fielding as Nicolette
 Charlotte Dylan as Favourite
 Ayoola Smart as Zéphine
 Hayley Carmichael as Madame Magloire
 Liz Carr as Fantine's Concierge
 Ashley Artus as Gendarme
 Matthew Steer as Blachevelle
 Lorcan Cranitch as Chief Inspector
 Georgie Glen as Abbess
 Anna Calder-Marshall as Madame Rully
 Natalie Simpson as Sister Simplice
Angela Wynter as Toussaint
Lily Newmark as Sophie

Episodes

Production

Development
The Weinstein Company was initially set to co-produce the series and serve as its distributor in the U.S. and China. The studio was dropped, however, following the Harvey Weinstein sexual abuse allegations. PBS member station WGBH Boston, through their television series Masterpiece, replaced The Weinstein Company as a co-producer of the series.

Filming
Filming for the series began in February 2018 in Belgium and Northern France.

Release
BBC Studios handles distribution for the series. The drama, which consists of six episodes, premiered on 30 December 2018. In New Zealand, the series was released on TVNZ 1 and its free streaming service TVNZ OnDemand.

In the US, the series was aired on PBS, starting 21 April 2019, to end on 19 May 2019.

Reception
Les Misérables has received positive reviews from critics. The miniseries holds a 87% approval rating on review aggregation website Rotten Tomatoes with an average score of 7.53/10, based on 39 critic reviews. The site's consensus reads "Andrew Davies' deft adaptation of the oft-retold Victor Hugo classic affords viewers a newfound intimacy with these outcasts and revolutionaries, who are ably brought to life by a star-studded cast."

Collins' performance as Fantine received praise from critics. Alexandra Pollard of The Independent praised her performance, writing "she plays the tragic Fantine with steeliness and grace", and described it as "magnificent." West's performance as Valjean in the final episode also received critical praise. Gabriel Tate of The Telegraph praised his performance, writing "Dominic West steals the show in a stirring finale."

The television mini-series on PBS was described as "an engrossing treat, featuring a vibrant cast and taking its time to unspool the melodrama and offer loving looks at 19th century France." It "hews closely to the source material without skipping too much plot or character motivations", the source material being the 19th century novel by Victor Hugo. The casting is commended, with many strong performances. The plot cannot carry all the detail of Hugo's novel of his characters in a tumultuous time in France, but "when all the cannons are fired and last stands are taken, the sacrifices given do not feel insignificant.". The story is told keeping "the narrative clear and allowing character-driven scenes to breathe."

Allison Keene of Collider wrote, "Emotional, engrossing" with 5 stars.

See also
 Adaptations of Les Misérables

Notes

References

External links
 
 
Novel by Victor Hugo, English translation:
https://www.gutenberg.org/files/135/135-h/135-h.htm

2010s British drama television series
2018 British television series debuts
2019 British television series endings
BBC television dramas
2010s British television miniseries
English-language television shows
Television shows based on French novels
Television shows set in France
Works based on Les Misérables
Television series by BBC Studios